SDAP may refer to:

 Social Democratic Workers' Party (Netherlands), a Dutch political party founded in 1894 that later merged into the Labour Party (Netherlands)
 Social Democratic Workers' Party of Germany, a German political party founded in 1869 that later merged into the Social Democratic Party of Germany
 Social Democratic Party of Austria, an Austrian major party, founded in 1898
 Service data adaptation protocol , a protocol specified by 3GPP for the 5G networks